The City of Stoke-on-Trent Sixth Form College is a mixed sixth form college on Leek Road, Stoke-on-Trent. It opened its new building on Leek Road in September 2010 having previously been located on Victoria Road, Fenton. The college is also known as Stoke-on-Trent Sixth Form College, and - prior to its relocation - Fenton Sixth Form College.

Admissions
The college specialises in educating years 12 and 13, where students can gain AS, A2 and BTEC qualifications. More than 95% of students are aged between 16 and 19. About 90% of students are of White British heritage, with a large minority being British Pakistanis.  About 70% of students come from the city, with the rest journeying in from North Staffordshire.

The college requires a minimum of four GCSEs at A* to C grades, rather than the minimum five usually required.

History
The college was established in 1970 on Victoria Road, Fenton; making it the first purpose-built sixth form college in the country. Next to it was the Fenton Manor Sports Complex. Originally build with a capacity of 700 students, it eventually came to teach more than double that figure.

The idea of a 'University Quarter' was first announced in 2004, and was developed for the next few years. A December 2004 report gave most teaching staff a grade of good or better. In November 2006 an Ofsted report gave the college a 'satisfactory' grade, and gave a good or better teaching and learning in 72% of lessons. In late 2008 planning permission was given for the college to build a new campus on Leek Road, as part of a £1.5 billion regeneration project in North Staffordshire. The project was suspended in January 2009, and concerns were made if sufficient funds could be found. The site was handed over to developers in March 2009, just as an Ofsted report gave the college a 'satisfactory' grade. In September 2010 the college officially moved to Leek Road, Stoke-on-Trent.

The college was named in July 2019 as a computing hub for the National Centre for Computing Education.

Academic standards
The school competes with four other institutes in the city: St Joseph's College, St Margaret Ward Catholic Academy, St Thomas More Catholic Academy and Stoke-on-Trent College. Of these only Shelton based Stoke-on-Trent College is not attached to a school.

Performance table

Note
The points system has changed over the years, leading to big jumps in some years.

Feeder Schools
The college has feeder schools throughout the city.

Many of the students go on to local Universities Staffordshire and Keele.

Notable staff and students
Anthony Bale, medievalist
Lee Chapman, student, footballer
Arthur Katalayi, student, Global Ambassador for Giving Back to Africa
David Kidney, student, Labour MP
Neil Morrissey, student, actor
Anna Richardson, student, TV Presenter
Jonathan Wilkes, student, entertainer and friend of Robbie Williams

References

External links
Burslem campus
uniq-stoke.org

Buildings and structures in Stoke-on-Trent
Education in Stoke-on-Trent
Educational institutions established in 1970
Sixth form colleges in Staffordshire